Baqeleh (also Romanized as Bāqeleh; also known as Pākaleh) is a village in Cheshmeh Kabud Rural District, in the Central District of Harsin County, Kermanshah Province, Iran. At the 2006 census, its population was 78, in 18 families.

References 

Populated places in Harsin County